The men's 100 metres T46 took place in Stadium Australia.

There were three heats and one final round. The T46 is for athletes who have amputations below or above their elbows.

Heats

Heat 1

Heat 2

Heat 3

Final round

References

Athletics at the 2000 Summer Paralympics